The 1939 West Virginia Mountaineers football team was an American football team that represented West Virginia University as an independent during the 1939 college football season. In its third and final season under head coach Marshall Glenn, the team compiled a 2–6–1 record and was outscored by a total of 94 to 70. The team played its home games at Mountaineer Field in Morgantown, West Virginia. Albert Baisi and Harry Clarke were the team captains.

Schedule

References

West Virginia
West Virginia Mountaineers football seasons
West Virginia Mountaineers football